Luisa Stefani and Zhang Shuai defeated the defending champion Shuko Aoyama and her partner Chan Hao-ching in the final, 3–6, 6–2, [10–8] to win the doubles tennis title at the 2023 Abu Dhabi Open.

Aoyama and Ena Shibahara were the reigning champions from 2021, when the event was last held, but Shibahara chose not to compete this year.

Seeds

Draw

Draw

References

External links
Main draw

Abu Dhabi Women's Tennis Open - Doubles